Ettenheim is a town in the Ortenaukreis, Baden-Württemberg, Germany.

History
Ettenheim received town rights in the 13th century from the Prince-Bishop of Strasbourg, whose territory on the right bank of the Rhine Ettenheim would form the center of until 1803, when it was mediatized to the Grand Duchy of Baden. Karlsruhe assigned Ettenheim to the district of Mahlberg, but then in 1809 made it the seat of its own district until 1824.

Louis Antoine, Duke of Enghien took refuge here in 1801 after he was suspected in a plot against Napoleon. He was arrested on 15 March 1804 and later executed in Paris. Louis René Édouard de Rohan-Guéméné, Prince-Bishop of Strasbourg, also lived here from 1790 and plotted a counter-revolution from the city. He is buried in the local Catholic church.

Geography
The township (Stadt) of Ettenheim lies on the southern edge of the Ortenau district of Baden-Württemberg, along the former's border with the Emmendingen district. The main watercourse in the municipal area is the Ettenbach, which, at the municipality's western border, marks its lowest elevation above sea level at  Normalnull (NN). The highest elevation,  NN, is found in the municipality's northeast, in the buntsandstein mountains of the Central Black Forest around Lahr. In the foothills of those mountains that fall within Ettenheim's municipal area are the wetlands of the Seltenbach, which are protected as the  nature reserve.

Climate
Ettenheim's climate has mild differences between its highs and lows, with adequate year-round rainfall. The Köppen Climate Classification subtype for this climate is "Cfb" (Marine West Coast Climate/Oceanic climate), though it is close to being "humid subtropical climate" due to the mean temperatures in July and August just under 22°C.

Politics

Coat of arms

The coat of arms of Ettenheim displays a castle in red, with an open gate and three towers (one domed) topped with crosses, upon a field of white. This pattern was designed in 1901 by the  after a seal from 1545, though the tincture was decided in 1973. Since 1370, local town seals had depicted a Gothic structure with three towers and a crenelated wall, a reference to Ettenheim's defenses.

Transportation
Ettenheim is connected to Germany's network of roadways by Bundesautobahn 5 and Bundesstraße 3, which pass through the city. The Mannheim–Karlsruhe–Basel railway passes through the municipality to the west of Ettenheim itself.

The next train station Orschweier is about 1 mile away.

References

External links
  

Ortenaukreis
Baden